Tsuga caroliniana, the Carolina hemlock, is a species of hemlock endemic to the United States.

Distribution and habitat
Carolina hemlock is native to the Appalachian Mountains in southwest Virginia, western North Carolina, extreme northeast Georgia, northwest South Carolina, and eastern Tennessee. The optimal growing condition is a partly shady area with moist but well-drained soil in a cool climate. There is a small, self-sustaining population of Carolina hemlock in the Virginia Kendall State Park Historic District of the Cuyahoga Valley National Park in northeast Ohio planted originally as part of  reforestation efforts during the park’s development in the 1930s and 40s.

Description
The bark is thick and reddish-brown, and becomes fissured between scaly ridges. The branches are stout and usually horizontal, but often slightly drooping. The shoots are red-brown to orange-brown, and finely hairy. They are glossy dark green above and paler on the underside, with two white stomatal bands. When fully open, their scales are positioned at a right angle or reflexed to the central axis.

Threats
The hemlock woolly adelgid (Adelges tsugae), an adelgid introduced to the United States from Asia in 1924, threatens Carolina hemlock, which is as susceptible as the related eastern hemlock.

Horticulture
Carolina hemlock is used more often as an ornamental tree than for timber production, due to its overall rarity. In landscaping, it is similar in appearance to eastern hemlock, but the Carolina hemlock has a deep taproot, compared with the shallow, aggressive roots of eastern hemlock. This means shrubs and other plants can be grown more easily under Carolina hemlock.

References

caroliniana
Flora of the Appalachian Mountains
Trees of the Southeastern United States
Natural history of the Great Smoky Mountains
Plants described in 1881